The Low Road may refer to:
The Low Road (novel), 2007 novel by Chris Womersley
The Low Road (play), 2013 play by Bruce Norris